The Allegan Area Educational Service Agency (AAESA) is an intermediate school district in Michigan, headquartered in Allegan.

Most of Allegan County is served by the Allegan Area Educational Service Agency, which coordinates the efforts of local boards of education, but has no operating authority over schools. Local school boards in Michigan retain great autonomy over day-to-day operations.

Composition
The Allegan Area Educational Service Agency includes many public school districts, private schools, charter schools, and facilities.

Governance
The Allegan Area Educational Service Agency is governed by a publicly elected board of education, who is responsible for hiring a superintendent to serve as the chief administrative officer of the agency.

Public school districts
As of the 2014–2015 school year, the communities of Allegan County are served by the following members of the Allegan Area Educational Service Agency:
 Allegan Public Schools
 Fennville Public Schools
 Glenn Public School
 Hopkins Public Schools
 Martin Public Schools
 Otsego Public Schools
 Plainwell Community Schools
 Wayland Union Schools

Private schools
The Allegan Area Educational Service Agency includes several private schools, such as East Martin Christian High School and Heritage Christian Academy.

Charter schools
The Allegan Area Educational Service Agency includes charter schools, such as Outlook Academy.

Agencies and facilities
The Allegan Area Educational Service Agency includes agencies and facilities such as Allegan County Area Technical & Education Center and the Hillside Learning & Behavior Centers.

See also
 List of intermediate school districts in Michigan

References

External links
 

Education in Allegan County, Michigan
Intermediate school districts in Michigan